Lee Morgan (retroactively titled The Last Session) is the final studio album by jazz trumpeter Lee Morgan, released only after his death in 1972. It was originally released on the Blue Note label in 1972 as a double LP, and features performances by Morgan, Grachan Moncur III, Bobbi Humphrey, Billy Harper, Harold Mabern, Reggie Workman, Jymie Merritt and Freddie Waits.

Reception
The Allmusic review by Michael G. Nastos awarded the album 4 stars, noting that with his last studio recordings Morgan took a step towards jazz fusion without sacrificing his artistic integrity: "It is unfortunate that the brilliant and forward-thinking Morgan was cut down at such a young age, for as the music was changing, he would have adapted, as this final statement valiantly suggests."

Track listing 
 "Capra Black" (Harper) - 15:31
 "In What Direction Are You Headed?" (Mabern) - 16:29
 "Angela" (Merritt) - 6:24
 "Croquet Ballet" (Harper) - 10:51
 "Inner Passions Out" (Waits) - 17:36

Personnel 
 Lee Morgan - trumpet
 Grachan Moncur III - trombone
 Bobbi Humphrey - flute
 Billy Harper - tenor saxophone, alto flute
 Harold Mabern - piano, electric piano
 Reggie Workman - bass, percussion
 Jymie Merritt - electric upright bass
 Freddie Waits - drums, recorder

References 

Hard bop albums
Lee Morgan albums
1972 albums
Blue Note Records albums
Albums produced by George Butler (record producer)
Albums recorded at Van Gelder Studio